William Cooley (1783–1863), was an American settler in Florida.

William Cooley may also refer to:

William Desborough Cooley (1795?–1883), Irish geographer 
William T. Cooley, United States Air Force major general
William W. Cooley (born 1930), American educational researcher